The second season of the television series The Wire of 12 episodes first aired in the United States on HBO in 2003 from June 1 to August 24. While continuing the series' central themes of dysfunctional institutions and the societal effects of the drug trade, the second season also explores the decline of the American working class, and the hardship its members endure during the transition from an industrial to post-industrial society.

It was released as a five-disc DVD boxed set in January 2005.

Summary
The second season continued to follow the police and those involved with the Barksdale drug-dealing organization. The returning cast included Dominic West as Officer Jimmy McNulty, whose insubordinate tendencies and personal problems continued to overshadow his ability. Lance Reddick reprised his role as Lieutenant Cedric Daniels, who was sidelined because of his placement of case over career, but used his political acumen to regain some status. Sonja Sohn played Kima Greggs, who had transferred to a desk job, but could not resist the lure of a good case. Deirdre Lovejoy continued as assistant state's attorney Rhonda Pearlman, the legal liaison between the detail and the courthouse.

Wood Harris and Larry Gilliard, Jr. reprised their roles as newly incarcerated drug dealers Avon and D'Angelo Barksdale. Idris Elba's character Stringer Bell took over the operations of the Barksdale Organization. Andre Royo returned as Bubbles, who continued to indulge his drug addiction and act as an occasional informant.

The police were overseen by two commanding officers who are concerned with politics and promoting their own careers: Colonel William Rawls (John Doman) and Acting Commissioner Ervin Burrell (Frankie Faison). Wendell Pierce portrayed homicide detective Bunk Moreland, who became more involved with the core case. Previously recurring guest star Clarke Peters joined the starring cast and his character, veteran detective Lester Freamon, joined the homicide unit as Moreland's new partner.

The new season also introduced a further group of characters working in the Baltimore port area, including Spiros "Vondas" Vondopoulos (Paul Ben-Victor), Beadie Russell (Amy Ryan), and Frank Sobotka (Chris Bauer). Vondas was the underboss of a global smuggling operation, Russell an inexperienced Port Authority officer and single mother thrown in at the deep end of a multiple homicide investigation, and Sobotka a union leader who turned to crime in order to raise funds to save his union.

Also joining the show in season two were recurring characters Nick Sobotka (Pablo Schreiber), Frank's nephew; Ziggy Sobotka (James Ransone), Frank's troubled son; and "The Greek" (Bill Raymond), Vondas' mysterious boss. 

Returning guest stars included: Jim True-Frost as Detective Roland "Prez" Pryzbylewski; Seth Gilliam as newly promoted Sergeant Ellis Carver; Domenick Lombardozzi as errant Detective Thomas "Herc" Hauk; J.D. Williams as Barksdale crew chief Bodie Broadus; and Michael K. Williams as renowned stick-up man Omar Little.

Cast

Main cast
 Dominic West as Jimmy McNulty (12 episodes)
 Chris Bauer as Frank Sobotka (12 episodes)
 Paul Ben-Victor as Spiros Vondas (10 episodes)
 John Doman as William Rawls (8 episodes)
 Idris Elba as Russell "Stringer" Bell (11 episodes)
 Frankie Faison as Ervin Burrell (5 episodes)
 Lawrence Gilliard Jr. as D'Angelo Barksdale (5 episodes)
 Wood Harris as Avon Barksdale (8 episodes)
 Deirdre Lovejoy as Rhonda Pearlman (7 episodes)
 Clarke Peters as Lester Freamon (11 episodes)
 Wendell Pierce as Bunk Moreland (12 episodes)
 Lance Reddick as Cedric Daniels (12 episodes)
 Andre Royo as Reginald "Bubbles" Cousins (4 episodes)
 Amy Ryan as Beadie Russell (12 episodes)
 Sonja Sohn as Kima Greggs (10 episodes)

Episodes

Reception
On Metacritic, the second season achieved an aggregate score of 95 out of 100, indicating universal acclaim. On Rotten Tomatoes, the season has an approval rating of 95% with an average score of 8.8 out of 10 based on 21 reviews. The website's critical consensus reads, "An ambitious introduction to a new network of characters allows The Wire to expand its focus on societal ills."

Awards and nominations
20th TCA Awards
Nomination for Outstanding Achievement in Drama

References

External links 
 
 

2003 American television seasons
 2